Edgar Antonio Denis Ayala (born 11 December 1969 in Asunción, Paraguay), known as Edgar Denis, is a former Paraguayan footballer who played for Clubs of Paraguay, Argentina and Chile.He played for the Paraguay national football team in the Copa América Uruguay 1995.

Teams
  Colón de Santa Fe 1993-1994
  Cerro Corá 1995-1996
  Shanghai Shenhua 1997
  Colegiales 1997-2001
  Audax Italiano 2001
  Colegiales 2002-2005

Notes

External links
 
 

1969 births
Living people
Sportspeople from Asunción
Paraguayan footballers
Paraguayan expatriate footballers
Paraguay international footballers
1995 Copa América players
Club Atlético Colón footballers
Audax Italiano footballers
Cerro Corá footballers
Atlético Colegiales players
Chilean Primera División players
Argentine Primera División players
Expatriate footballers in Chile
Expatriate footballers in Argentina
Expatriate footballers in China
Shanghai Shenhua F.C. players
Association football forwards
20th-century Paraguayan people
Deportivo Capiatá managers
Deportivo Santaní managers